Herbert Botley "Harry" Bell (October 31, 1925 – August 27, 2009) was a Canadian professional ice hockey defenceman who played in one National Hockey League game for the New York Rangers during the 1946–47 season, on March 23, 1947 against the Chicago Black Hawks. The rest of his career, which lasted from 1943 to 1953, was spent in the minor leagues.

Career statistics

Regular season and playoffs

See also
 List of players who played only one game in the NHL

External links
 

1925 births
2009 deaths
Canadian expatriate ice hockey players in the United States
Canadian ice hockey defencemen
Ice hockey people from Saskatchewan
New Haven Ramblers players
New York Rangers players
New York Rovers players
St. Paul Saints (USHL) players
Sportspeople from Regina, Saskatchewan
Tacoma Rockets (WHL) players